Shahrestan (also Romanized as Shahrestān; also known as Khoshk-e Bījār, Shagrestan, Shahrestān-e Khoshgh Bijar, and Shahrestān-e Kohdam) is a village in Hajji Bekandeh-ye Koshk-e Bijar Rural District, Khoshk-e Bijar District, Rasht County, Gilan Province, Iran. At the 2006 census, its population was 874, in 279 families.

References 

Populated places in Rasht County